Marcel Van De Keere (27 April 1931 – 1994) was a Belgian boxer. He competed in the men's lightweight event at the 1952 Summer Olympics.

References

1931 births
1994 deaths
Belgian male boxers
Olympic boxers of Belgium
Boxers at the 1952 Summer Olympics
Sportspeople from Ghent
Lightweight boxers